Easton on the Hill is a village and civil parish  at the north eastern tip of North Northamptonshire, England. The village had a population at the 2011 census was 1,015. The village, sited on the A43 road, is compact in form, with the older part of the village located north of the High Street. The parish extends from the River Welland in the north to the western end of RAF Wittering. The village is also on the shortest boundary in England with it being in the northernmost part of Northamptonshire between Stamford and Collyweston.

The villages name means 'east farm/settlement' on the hill.

All Saints Church dates from the twelfth century and has been enlarged and altered over the centuries. The church is a Grade I listed building.

The village contains the "Priest's House", a late fifteenth-century building restored in 1867 and now owned by the National Trust; it contains a small museum about the area.

The commander of HMS Lutine, Captain Lancelot Skynner, came from Easton, where his father John was the rector for many years. Plaques on the former rectory (now Glebe House but known for a time as Lutine House) and in the church commemorate this and Captain Skynner. The frigate Lutine sank during a storm  in the West Frisian Islands on 9 October 1799, whilst carrying a large shipment of gold. Lloyd's of London has preserved her salvaged bell - the Lutine Bell - which is used for ceremonial purposes at their headquarters in London.

The head office of the Chartered Institute of Procurement & Supply (CIPS) is located at Easton House in the village, close to the church.

Easton on the Hill Rural District existed from 1894 to 1935. The parish has its own parish council and was represented on East Northamptonshire Council and on the county council as part of the Prebendal electoral division. Easton on the Hill is represented in the House of Commons by the Member of Parliament for Corby. At the time of the 2001 census, the parish's population was 956 people.

Notes

References

External links
Village web site
Parish Council web site

Villages in Northamptonshire
North Northamptonshire
Civil parishes in Northamptonshire